Louis How (1873–1947) was a prolific twentieth-century poet and a biographer of his grandfather, James Buchanan Eads, who built the Eads Bridge crossing the Mississippi River at St. Louis.

How had one brother, James Eads How. Not only was their grandfather a wealthy engineer and contractor, but their father, James Flintham How, was a vice-president and the General Manager of the Wabash Railroad. Thus they were the heirs of one of St. Louis's most wealthy families. While his brother chose to live as a hobo and spent his efforts trying to help the homeless, Louis How "became an artist and took to the gay bohemian life".

While How certainly wrote from a position of knowledge and authority when he created the biography of his grandfather, the biography was criticized in a review from MIT.

Before his poetry was first published, How had compiled a manuscript anthology of American poetry, but never published it. His manuscript was responsible for a revival of interest in early American poet Frederick Goddard Tuckerman.

Criticism 
How was discussed in an article in Reedy's Mirror (a journal published in his home town of St. Louis) in association with Amy Lowell and Ezra Pound in 1915 in an article written by Zoë Akins.

Works 
 James B. Eads. Boston: Houghton Mifflin and Co. (c.1900)
 The Penitentes of San Rafael. Indianapolis: The Bowen-Merrill Co. (1900).

Poetry 
 Lyrics and Sonnets. Boston: Sherman, French (1911).
 The Youth Replies. (1912)
 Barricades. Boston: Sherman, French (1914).
 A Hidden Well: Lyrics and Sonnets. (1916)
 Nursery Rhymes of New York City. (1919)
 Ruin and Gold. London: Chapman & Hall (1924).
 Narcissus and Other Poems. New York: Harbor Press (1928). Illustrated by Walter Dorwin Teague.
 The Other Don Juan. New York: Harbor Press (1932). Illustrated by Steele Savage.
 The Years Relent. Harbor Press. (1936)
 Regional Rhymes of New York City. New York: Harbor Press (1937). Illustrated by Ilse Bischoff.
 An Evening with Ninon, A Didactic Poem containing a translation of Racine’s Bernice. New York: Harbor Press (1941.) Illustrated by Boris Artzybasheff.

Translations
 The life of Lazarillo de Tormes and his fortunes and adversities, done out of the Castilian from R. Foulché-Delbosc's restitution of the editio princeps. New York: M. Kennerley (1917)
 Caesar or Nothing, by Pío Baroja. (1919)
 The Comedy of Dante Alighieri, Florentine by Birth but Not in Conduct. (1934–1940). Illustrated by Boris Artzybasheff.

References

External links 
 
 
 Open Library
 Works by Louis How at The Online Books Page

1873 births
1947 deaths
Writers from St. Louis
American male poets
Translators of Dante Alighieri